Regina Schleicher  (born 21 March 1974 in Würzburg) is a German professional cyclist.

Whilst young, Regina's family moved to Marktheidenfeld where she attended school.  Her father, Hans Schleicher (born 1949) is a cycle racing coach and led her cycling career which began when she competed in the  RV Concordia Karbach in Karbach, Lower Franconia.

Palmarès 

2005
German Road Race Champion
1994
European U23 Road Race Champion
2002
UCI World Cup Race, Plouay
UCI World Cup Race, Gran Premio Castilla y León
Stage win, Giro d'Italia
2003
4 stage wins, Giro d'Italia
2 stage wins “Canada round travel”
Vuelta Castilla y León
2004
Stage win, Giro d'Italia
Stage win, Giro del Trentino
Stage win, Route OF Montreal
Stage win, Vuelta Castilla y León
Stage win, Holland Ladies Tour
2005
Stage win, Giro d'Italia
Road Race World Champion
2006 (Equipe Nürnberger Versicherung)
Trofeo Alfredo Binda-Comune di Cittiglio
2 stage wins, Holland Ladies Tour
2007
Stage win, Holland Ladies Tour

External links 
 message on the BRV
 further data about Regina Schleicher at her present team
 
 

Sportspeople from Würzburg
1974 births
Living people
German female cyclists
UCI Road World Champions (women)
Cyclists from Bavaria
20th-century German women
21st-century German women